The Germantown Cricket Club is a cricket club in the Germantown neighborhood of Philadelphia, Pennsylvania, USA. It was one of the four principal cricket clubs in the city and was one of the clubs contributing members to the Philadelphian cricket team. It was founded on 10 August 1854 in what is now the northwest section of the city, and is the nation's second oldest cricket club. Its clubhouse was designed by architects McKim, Mead & White. The U.S. National tennis championship, precursor to today's US Open,  was played on Germantown Cricket's lawn tennis courts from 1921 to 1923.

The Germantown Cricket Club was located in Nicetown from 1877 until 1890 when it moved to its present Manheim Street location after merging with the Young America Cricket Club in 1890. The Newhall brothers joined the Germantown cricket team at this time after being the backbone of the Young America Cricket Club for forty years. 

It continues as a private club with facilities for tennis, squash, swimming, and special events. The club's facilities are a designated National Historic Landmark.

See also
Philadelphian cricket team
Philadelphia Cricket Club
Merion Cricket Club
Belmont Cricket Club
List of National Historic Landmarks in Philadelphia
National Register of Historic Places listings in Northwest Philadelphia

References

Further reading

External links

 

Clubhouses on the National Register of Historic Places in Philadelphia
Sports in Philadelphia
American club cricket teams
Cricket clubs established in 1854
Sports venues completed in 1890
National Historic Landmarks in Pennsylvania
McKim, Mead & White buildings
1854 establishments in Pennsylvania
History of Philadelphia
Germantown, Philadelphia
Cricket in Philadelphia
1924 International Lawn Tennis Challenge
1925 International Lawn Tennis Challenge
1926 International Lawn Tennis Challenge
1927 International Lawn Tennis Challenge
1938 International Lawn Tennis Challenge